Hugh Oldham (March 18, 1943 - July 25, 2008) was a Canadian football player who played for the Ottawa Rough Riders. He played college football at the University of Oregon.

References

1943 births
2008 deaths
Ottawa Rough Riders players
Oregon Ducks football players
People from Caldwell, Texas
Players of American football from Texas